Kantilal Bhuria (born 1 June 1950) is an Indian politician and a member of  Indian National Congress and was till July 2011 the Minister of Tribal Affairs of the Republic of India. He had been promoted to the rank of cabinet minister in the United Progressive Alliance-2 government, led by the Prime Minister Manmohan Singh in 2009. Earlier, he was the Minister of State in the Ministry of Agriculture and Minister of State in the Ministry of Consumer Affairs, Food and Public Distribution. His successor, the new Minister of Tribal Affairs is V Kishore Chandra Deo, another Congressman.

Bhuria was elected to the Lok Sabha in 1998, 1999 and 2004 from Jhabua constituency in Madhya Pradesh and in 2009 from Ratlam. He lost 2014 General Election from Ratlam but won the by-poll in 2015. He lost in 2019 General Election again, but was elected to Madhya Pradesh Vidhan Sabha later in 2019 when he won a by-poll in Jhabua (Vidhan Sabha constituency).

References

External links
 Members of Fourteenth Lok Sabha - Parliament of India website

Living people
1950 births
Indian National Congress politicians from Madhya Pradesh
Union ministers of state of India
People from Jhabua
Members of the Cabinet of India
Lok Sabha members from Madhya Pradesh
India MPs 1998–1999
India MPs 1999–2004
India MPs 2004–2009
India MPs 2009–2014
India MPs 2014–2019
People from Ratlam district
Ministers of Tribal Affairs (India)
Madhya Pradesh MLAs 2018–2023